Amos Hargrett (September 14, 1833 - November 1905) was a farmer, county commissioner, justice of the peace, and delegate to Florida's 1885 Constitutional Convention. He was one of seven delegates who were African American. Former Florida state senator James Hargrett is his great-grandson.

He was born in Miccosukee, Florida. He was enslaved.

He served as a Wakulla County Commissioner from 1868 to 1870 during the Reconstruction era. He served as commissioner of pilotage in St. Marks  from 1874 to 1877. He served as a justice of the peace in Wakulla County in 1876 and 1877 and was a delegate to Florida's 1885 Constitutional Convention. From 1892 to 1894 he served as postmaster in St. Marks. A hushand and father he served as a deacon in the Missionary Baptist Church for thirty years. Amos Hargrett Jr. (1865 - 1931) was born in Wakulla County.

He served on the board of canvassers with W. T. Duval and James W. Smith Jr. in 1877.

He is buried at the Walker Cemetery.

See also
Andrew Hargrett
Jim Hargrett
Doris Hargrett Clack
African-American officeholders during and following the Reconstruction era

References

1833 births
1905 deaths
American freedmen
Date of death unknown
People from Wakulla County, Florida
19th-century American politicians
19th-century African-American politicians
African-American politicians during the Reconstruction Era
African-American people in Florida politics